A bogie or railroad truck holds the wheel sets of a rail vehicle.

Axlebox  
An axle box, also known as a journal box in North America, is the mechanical subassembly on each end of the axles under a railway wagon, coach or locomotive; it contains bearings and thus transfers the wagon, coach or locomotive weight to the wheels and rails; the bearing design is typically oil-bathed plain bearings on older rolling stock, or roller bearings on newer rolling stock.

Plain bearings are now illegal for interchange service in North America. As early as 1908 axle boxes contained a set of long cylindrical rollers allowing the axle to rotate. It was also used on steam locomotives such as the Victorian Railways A2 class, the LMS Garratt, the LSWR 415 class, and the GCR Class 1.

Center pin 
A large steel pin—or rod—which passes through the center plates on the body bolster and truck bolster. The truck turns about the pin, and stress is taken by the center plates.

Center plate  
One of a pair of plates which fit one into the other and support the car body on the trucks allowing them to turn freely under the car. The one on the truck may also be called center bowl.

Truck side frame 
The frame at either side of the truck.

Truck bolster 
Each truck has a bolster—a transverse floating beam—between the side frames. It is the central part of every truck on which the underframe of the railcar or railroad car is pivoted through the center pivot pin.

Side bearing 
There is one side bearing located on each side of the centerplate on the truck bolster. In case of a shared bogie on an articulated car, there are two on each side.

Brake rigging 
The brake rigging includes the brake lever, the brake hanger, the brake pin, the brake beam and the brake shoes.

Image gallery

See also 

 Axle track
 Ball bearings, or roller bearings, replaced journal bearings for interchange
 Glossary of North American railway terms
 Glossary of rail transport terms
 ICF Bogie
 Roller bearings, replaced journal bearings for interchange
 Rotation around a fixed axis
 Stuffing box
 Timmis system, an early form of coil spring used on railway axles.
 Train wheel
 Wheelbase
 Wheelset

References

Further reading 
 US Army Field Manual FM 55-20, Figure 8-8, Department of the Army, Washington DC
 Car and Locomotive Cyclopedia 1970

External links 
 Bogies/Trucks

 
Truck parts

Car-related lists
Wikipedia glossaries using subheadings